"Waiting to Exhale" is the second episode of the second season and fourteenth overall episode of the American television drama series Dexter, which first aired on 7 October 2007 on Showtime in the United States. The episode was written by Clyde Phillips and was directed by Marcos Siega.

Title 
The episode is titled after the best selling novel written by Terry McMillan, which was also a 1995 major motion picture starring Whitney Houston and Angela Bassett.

Plot

Masuka explains to Dexter about how the killer may be able to dispose of the body fully. The FBI does a briefing about the case and how it is the largest case in the precincts history.The Miami Metro Police Department, led by FBI Special Agent Frank Lundy, begins the hunt for the "Bay Harbor Butcher". Lundy displays several pictures of the crime scene during a briefing session. Dexter becomes worried because Lundy is now on the case. Both Dexter and the police are hunting for Little Chino, and Dexter is determined to kill him properly given a second chance. He tries to kill Little Chino at a party but is unable to do so.  It turns out to be an ambush and he is almost captured by gang members. Debra and Dexter struggle to overcome memories of the encounter with Brian that led to his death. After Paul's funeral, Rita confronts Dexter about his involvement in Paul's death, and he admits to having an addiction, which Rita infers to be to drugs. She tells him that he can get help and they will get through it together. LaGuerta shows surprising support for her new boss.  Dexter finally is able to kill Little Chino and finds a new dumping ground.

Production
Filming locations for the episode included Miami, Florida as well as San Pedro (including St. Peter's Catholic Church) and Pasadena, California.

Reception

The episode was positively received. IGN's Eric Goldman gave the episode a rating of 8.4 out of 10, and commented that "subtlety is often not this show's strong point. But overall, this is another interesting episode that does a solid job of looking at Dexter's relationship with various adversaries, past and present [...] and showing how he reacts to their presence in his life." The A.V. Club critic Scott Tobias gave the episode a B+ grade and stated that it "turns into a strong meditation on grief, and the various ways people say goodbye to the flawed souls that have shaped their lives. In other words, it was basically an episode of Six Feet Under, except the deaths here are of unnatural causes."

References

External links

 
 "Waiting to Exhale" at Showtime's website

2007 American television episodes
Dexter (TV series) episodes
Television episodes directed by Marcos Siega